Monocentrota is a genus of flies belonging to the family Keroplatidae. The species of this genus are found in Europe.

Species:
 Monocentrota aethiopica Matile, 1974 
 Monocentrota comoreana Matile, 1979

References

Keroplatidae